Melaleuca glena is a plant in the myrtle family, Myrtaceae and is endemic to the south of Western Australia. It is similar to the commonly cultivated Melaleuca nesophila with its purple "pom-pom" flower heads but is a smaller shrub with the inflorescences much more often on the sides of the branches and only occasionally on the ends.

Description

The flowers are a shade of pink to purple and are arranged in heads or spikes usually only on the sides of the branches. The outer edge of the floral cup and the parts of the flowers covering the buds are covered with short, soft, silky white hairs. There are five bundles of stamens around the flower, each with 4 to 7 stamens.

Taxonomy and naming
Melaleuca glena was first formally described in 1999 by Lyndley Craven in Australian Systematic Botany from a specimen collected near Scaddan. The specific epithet (glena) is from the Ancient Greek glenos meaning “a thing to stare at" or "a thing to wonder at” referring to the lateral flower heads of this species.

Distribution and habitat
Melaleuca glena occurs in the Wittenoom Hills and Fitzgerald River districts near Esperance in the Esperance Plains and Mallee biogeographic regions where it grows in shrubland and mallee in clay soil over granite or laterite or a fossil bearing rock called spongolite.

Conservation
Melaleuca glena is listed as "not threatened" by the Government of Western Australia Department of Parks and Wildlife.

References

glena
Plants described in 1999
Endemic flora of Western Australia
Taxa named by Lyndley Craven